Francisco Fábregas Bosch (born July 1, 1949 in Barcelona) is a former field hockey player from Spain, who won the silver medal with the Men's National Team at the 1980 Summer Olympics in Moscow. He competed in four Olympics for Spain, starting in 1968.

References

External links
 

1949 births
Living people
Spanish male field hockey players
Olympic field hockey players of Spain
Field hockey players at the 1968 Summer Olympics
Field hockey players at the 1972 Summer Olympics
Field hockey players at the 1976 Summer Olympics
Field hockey players at the 1980 Summer Olympics
Field hockey players from Barcelona
Olympic silver medalists for Spain
Olympic medalists in field hockey
Medalists at the 1980 Summer Olympics